Yeongchuksan  is a mountain in South Korea. It extends over the cities of Ulsan and Yangsan in Gyeongsangnam-do. This mountain is also referred to as Yeongchwisan (영취산), Chwiseosan (취서산), and Chukseosan (축서산). It is part of the Yeongnam Alps mountain range.

See also
 List of mountains in Korea

Notes

References
 
 Photos and Map of hiking on Mt Yeongchuksan: http://www.everytrail.com/view_trip.php?trip_id=2001425

External links
 Official website for the Yeongnam Alps

Mountains of South Korea
Mountains of Ulsan
Mountains of South Gyeongsang Province